Lowpoint is an unincorporated community in Woodford County, Illinois, United States. Lowpoint is located along Illinois Route 89, south-southwest of Washburn. Lowpoint has a post office with ZIP code 61545.

Demographics

History

In 1895, Frank D. Banta was commissioned postmaster.  At this time the spelling of the name changed from Low Point to Lowpoint, to avoid confusion with the community of Long Point, about 40 miles northeast of Lowpoint.

References
https://archive.org/stream/woodfordcountyhi00wood#page/n0/mode/2up

Unincorporated communities in Woodford County, Illinois
Unincorporated communities in Illinois
Peoria metropolitan area, Illinois